Nielson is a surname. Notable people with the surname include:

Claire Nielson (born 1937), British television actress
Howard C. Nielson (born 1924), American politician from Utah; U.S. Representative 1983–91
Niel Nielson (born 1954), American academic; president of Covenant College, Georgia, USA
Poul Nielson (born 1943), Danish politician and government minister
Nielson (singer) (born 1989), Dutch singer-songwriter

See also
Neilson (disambiguation)
Nielsen (disambiguation)
Neilsen (disambiguation)
Nilsen

Patronymic surnames
Surnames from given names